Gelemenovo is a village in Pazardzhik Municipality, Pazardzhik Province, southern Bulgaria.  the population is 803. It is located at just a kilometre to the north of Trakiya motorway. There is an anti-hail installation near the village with disperses the hail-clounds in the summer with special missiles.

Villages in Pazardzhik Province